Krol Ko at Angkor, Cambodia, is a Buddhist temple built at the end of the 12th century under the rule of Jayavarman VII. It is north of Neak Pean.

External links
Krol Ko - Gallery and Documentation by khmer-heritage.de

Krol Ko Temple (late 12th or early 13th century)

Krol Ko is a small temple located just to the north of Neak Pean. It may have served as a chapel at a hospital site, as its layout is identical to the four hospital chapels found outside Angkor Thom (the 'Chapel of the Hospital' to the east, Ta Prohm Kel to the south, Tonle Sgnout to the north, and another site now in ruins to the west). Placement of a hospital close to Neak Pean would have made sense as Neak Pean was constructed as a representation of the waters of the mythical lake Anavatapta, which were thought to cure illnesses. More tellingly, seven of the temple pediments at Krol Ko feature Lokeshvara, the boddhisattva of healing, who was commonly associated with hospitals.
The name 'Krol Ko' is a modern term meaning 'The Park of the Oxen' and likely has no connection to its historical use.
Location

The approximate location of the site is 13.468189' N, 103.895401' E (WGS 84 map datum).

Buddhist temples in Siem Reap Province
Angkorian sites in Siem Reap Province
12th-century Buddhist temples